The 2017 AFF U-15 Championship was the twelfth edition of the AFF U-16 Championship (first edition of the under-15 era), the annual international youth association football championship organised by the ASEAN Football Federation for men's under-15 national teams of Southeast Asia. It had reverted from an under-16 competition to an under-15 competition in preparation for the AFC U-16 Championship 2018 qualifiers. Thailand, which were selected to host the tournament, returning for the first time since the cancelled 2009 AFF U-16 Youth Championship. Vietnam won the tournament after beating Thailand 4–2 on penalties in the final.

A total of 12 teams played in the tournament, with players born on or after 1 January 2002 eligible to participate. Each match had a duration of 80 minutes, consisting of two halves of 40 minutes.

Qualified teams 
There was no qualification, and all entrants advanced to the final tournament.
The following 12 teams from member associations of the ASEAN Football Federation entered the tournament.

Venues 
The competition was played at two venues in Chonburi, Chonburi Province: Chonburi Campus Stadium and Chonburi Stadium (in Mueang Chonburi).

Draw

Group stage 
The top two teams of each group advanced to the semi-finals.

Tiebreakers
The teams are ranked according to points (3 points for a win, 1 point for a draw, 0 points for a loss). If tied on points, tiebreakers are applied in the following order:
Goal difference in all the group matches;
Greater number of goals scored in all the group matches;
Result of the direct match between the teams concerned;
Kicks  from the penalty mark if the teams concerned are still on the field of play.
Lowest score using Fair Play Criteria;
Drawing of lots.

All matches held in Thailand.
All times are local, UTC+7.

Group A

Group B

Knockout stage 
In the knockout stage, the penalty shoot-outs are used to decide the winner if necessary (extra time is not used).

Bracket

Semi-finals

Third place match

Final

Winner

Goalscorers 
5 goals

 Sieng Chanthea

4 goals

 Chony Wenpaserth
 Suphanat Mueanta

3 goals

 Noah Botic
 Birkan Kirdar
 Jaiden Kucharski
 Bagus Kahfi
 Muhammad Amirul Ashrafiq Hanifah
 Muhammad Amirul Azzim Mohd Ruzki
 La Min Htwe
 Nguyễn Bá Dương

2 goals

 George Antonis
 Navarone Darjani
 Trent Ostler
 Lachlan Sepping
 Giovanni Stellitano
 Joshua Varga
 Addy Raimi
 Bunthoeun Bunnarong
 Brylian Aldama
 Muhammad Danial Amali
 Naung Naung Soe
 Đinh Thanh Trung
 Ngô Quang Thuận
 Nguyễn Quốc Hoàng
 Trịnh Văn Chung
 Võ Nguyên Hoàng

1 goal

 Brodie Broyce
 Stephan De Robillard
 Luke Duzel
 Thomas Main
 Ryan Teague
 Riley Warland
 Aminuddin Haji Masri
 Ros Darapich
 Althaf Alrizky
 Rendy Juliansyah
 Miftakhul Pradika
 Khamsavanh Louanthammakhanh
 Soubanh Keopheth
 Souphan Khambaion
 Mohammad Ikhwan Mohd Hafizo
 Mohammad Danish Ishak
 Harith Naem Jaineh
 Ahmad Zikri Mohd Khalili
 Muhammad Azrul Haikal Ramlee
 Yan Kyaw Soe
 Asignar Gonzales
 Ferrer Padernal
 Kittiphong Khetpara
 Thanarat Thumsen
 Thakdanai Jaihan
 Khuất Văn Khang
 Ngô Đức Hoàng
 Nguyễn Thế Hùng
 Trịnh Quang Trường
 Vũ Tiến Long

1 own goal

  Jack Simmons 
 Nyan Lin Htet

Final ranking

References

External links 

AFF U-15 Youth Championship
2017 in youth association football
2017